Mohamed Essam Khaled (born 11 January 1951) is an Egyptian basketball player. He competed in the men's tournament at the 1972 Summer Olympics and the 1976 Summer Olympics.

References

1951 births
Living people
Egyptian men's basketball players
Olympic basketball players of Egypt
Basketball players at the 1972 Summer Olympics
Basketball players at the 1976 Summer Olympics
Place of birth missing (living people)